Zagorodskaya is a rural locality (a village) in Saminskoye Rural Settlement, Vytegorsky District, Vologda Oblast, Russia. The population was 2 as of 2002.

Geography 
Zagorodskaya is located 44 km north of Vytegra (the district's administrative centre) by road. Pigarevo is the nearest rural locality.

References 

Rural localities in Vytegorsky District